Bar Topolski (previously known as the Topolski Century and Memoir of the 20th Century) is a bar and cafe in the Hungerford Bridge arches on the South Bank in London, England. Previously a gallery, it presented a large artwork by Feliks Topolski (1907–1989). In 2013, as a result of low visitor numbers and rising rents, the gallery became a bar, with some of the artwork remaining on display and the remainder being moved to a private studio.

The work was started in 1975 and opened by Prince Philip, Duke of Edinburgh in 1984. It presents a panoramic view of key events and people in the 20th century.
The artist worked on the panels from 1975 until his death.

References

External links 
 Bar Topolski website

 
Feliks Topolski: Tate Britain 
 
Feliks Topolski: National Galleries of Scotland
 
 

Art museums and galleries in London
Biographical museums in London
Buildings and structures in the London Borough of Southwark
Murals in London
1975 murals
Museums established in 1984
1984 establishments in England